The Papillon (French for 'butterfly[-eared]'), also called the Continental Toy Spaniel, is a breed of dog, of the spaniel type. One of the oldest of the toy spaniels, it derives its name from its characteristic butterfly-like look of the long and fringed hair on the ears. A Papillon with dropped ears is called a Phalene.

Appearance and behavior 

Papillons are very intelligent and self-assured dogs that have a very easy time learning new tricks. These dogs can be sociable with children and strangers, but are generally reserved around new people. They can also be socialized to get along well with other pets, but care should be taken with rambunctious pets or cats with claws, as they may injure them. If not properly socialized, Papillons can be distrustful and exhibit aggressive tendencies toward other dogs and people. Papillons may also be very playful and affectionate. Widely known as great companion dogs, they have the spirit and energy to keep up with active families, but can also be calm enough to be happy with sleeping in the arms of an equally affectionate owner. Due to their high energy level, they demand an augmented exercise routine, relative to the average companion breed. Papillons are known as excellent watchdogs, as they will alert their owner to changes in their environment. They may be considered garrulous like many other toy dogs. They can withstand heat, but are more sensitive to cold temperatures because of their single-coated fur, and should not be left outside unattended in cold weather.

The most iconic aspect of Papillons are their ears, which are large and well fringed, giving them a butterfly wing-like appearance. Papillons are particolored or white with patches of any color. An all-white dog or a dog with no white is disqualified from the conformation show ring. A blaze (area of white extending down between the eyes) and noseband is preferred over a solid-colored head, but not required. Nose, eye rims, and lips should be black. Paw pads vary in color from black to pink, depending on the coloring of the dog.

Papillons can be registered with the American Kennel Club as the following colors and markings, with types for show purposes indicated with S for standard or A for alternate:

The American Kennel Club breed standard indicates a conformance fault that may be penalized: failure of the non-white color to cover the front and back of both ears and to extend from the ears over both eyes. Not penalized are a slight extension of the white collar onto the base of the ears, or a few white hairs interspersed in the color – as long as "the butterfly appearance is not sacrificed".

Two ear variations of this breed are seen, the completely upright ears of the more common Papillon, and the dropped spaniel-like ears of the Phalène. The Phalène are likely a throwback to their spaniel ancestors. The American Kennel Club and the Fédération Cynologique Internationale (FCI) consider the Phalène and the Papillon the same breed.

Temperament

The temperament of Papillons is that of a happy, friendly, adventurous dog. They are generally neither shy nor aggressive. Papillons can make excellent family dogs, but should be watched around little children, as should any dog, due to a small child's lack of understanding of a dog's behavior and the likelihood that they will do something to upset the dog. Given the intelligence of Papillons, they require rigorous training and mental stimulation to prevent behavioral issues arising from boredom. According to Dr Stanley Coren, an expert on animal intelligence, Papillons are among the top ten brightest dogs, ranking 8th out of 138 breeds tested.

Lifespan
A 2002 Papillon Club of America survey found that the Papillons of their members lived an average of 11.45 years. Papillons can live up to 17 years.

Health

Papillons have only minor health concerns, although patellar luxation, seizures, and dental problems can be issues. Additionally, they can be at risk for progressive retinal atrophy, intervertebral disk disease, and allergies.

Exercise
Play will take care of a lot of their exercise needs; however, as with all breeds, play is not sufficient for all exercise. Daily walks or runs are an excellent way to exercise a Papillon. They also enjoy a good romp in a safe open area off leash, such as a large, fenced yard. Papillons are a very active breed of dog and enjoy having a job to perform. Papillon breeders recommend dog agility, rally obedience, or obedience training for Papillons because of their intelligence and energy level.

History

The history of the Papillon is traced through works of art. The earliest toy spaniels resembling the papillon are found in Italy. Titian painted these small dogs in many famous paintings beginning around 1500, including the Venus of Urbino (1542). Other well-known artists who included them in paintings are Watteau, Gonzales Coques, Fragonard, Paolo Veronese, and Mignard. In a painting after Largillierre in the Wallace Collection in London, a Papillon is clearly shown in a family portrait of Louis XIV. Papillons are also in paintings of royal families around Europe and paintings of merchant-class families. The breed was popular in England, France, and Belgium, which are considered countries of origin by the FCI.

The "Titian spaniels" and those portrayed by later artists through Mignard and his contemporaries had the drooping ears characteristic of today's Phalène; the erect-eared appearance did not become fashionable until the end of the 19th century. The Titian spaniels were also exclusively red-and-white in coloration, in contrast to the many recognized colorations of today's Papillon.

The Papillon's history and long association with royalty have led to many stories about the breed. Marie Antoinette is said to have walked to the guillotine clutching her small dog under her arm, likely an apocryphal tale. However, tradition has it that Marie Antoinette's dog was a small spaniel that had been brought to the French court from Spain on the back of pack mules. According to the story, her pup was spared and cared for in a building in Paris still called the Papillon House. Marie Antoinette's dog was said to have descended from a very old drop-eared breed known as the Epagneul Nain, or Continental Dwarf/Toy Spaniel that appeared in church frescos and paintings as early as the 13th century.

The Papillon is still officially referred to as the Epagneul Nain (ENC) in non-English-speaking countries. The name Squirrel Spaniel also has been used, most likely referring to an earlier standard in which the tail set is described as "curling over the back as a squirrel's". One version of the history of the two varieties of ear shape in the ENC ("papillon" to denote the erect ear and "phalène" to denote the dropped ear) is that toward the end of the 19th century, breed fanciers bred a version of the spaniel whose ears stood up. This dog was said to have been nicknamed papillon based on the impressively large, erect ears that resembled the wings of a butterfly. The drop-eared variety of the breed came to be called the Phalène (which means "night moth"). Both types are still bred today and appear in the same litter. The papillon variety is much more common, although recently, the Phalène has undergone a resurgence in popularity.

The Papillon was first recognized by the AKC in 1935 with the formation of the Papillon Club of America. By the end of the war, the club was no longer functioning, but it was reactivated in 1948, with its first postwar specialty held in September 1954. In 1999, Ch. Loteki Supernatural Being (call name "Kirby") owned and handled by John Oulton of Norwalk, Connecticut, became the first Papillon to win the prestigious "Best in Show" at the annual Westminster Kennel Club dog show. Kirby also won international success for the breed by taking the World Dog Show in Helsinki, Finland, and the Royal Invitational in Canada in 1998. Papillons also enjoy success today in competitive fields outside of conformation, including obedience and agility.

In 2019, Planet Waves Forever Young Daydream Believers (call name "Dylan") became the first Papillon to win Best in Show at Crufts.

See also
 Dogs portal
 List of dog breeds
 Lap dog
 Companion dog
 Toy Group

References

External links

 

FCI breeds
Companion dogs
Dog breeds originating in France
Dog breeds originating in Belgium
Spaniels